is a Japanese multimedia spin-off project from the Love Live! series and its game series Love Live! School Idol Festival. It was first introduced in 2017 as "Perfect Dream Project" and was initially created as part of the game Love Live! School Idol Festival All Stars. Unlike μ's and Aqours, the previous groups from the franchise, they are a group of individual school idols who compete with each other while working together to keep their school idol club alive. Together, they are referred as the  

They are featured in the spin-off game Love Live! School Idol Festival All Stars along with μ's and Aqours. They also appear as SR rarity cards in Love Live! School Idol Festival. The girls were initially split up into groups of three to begin activities in three different apps before their addition to the game: Dengeki Online website (Kasumi, Karin, Setsuna), Famitsu App website (Ayumu, Ai, Rina), and the game's official website (Emma, Shizuku, Kanata). Each place is working as a separate room or branch office for the Nijigasaki High School. Later, they were officially split into three subunits: DiverDiva, A・Zu・Na, and Qu4rtz. An anime television series adaptation by Bandai Namco Filmworks (formerly known as Sunrise) aired from October to December 2020. A second season aired from April to June 2022. An original video animation episode is set to premiere in theaters on Q3 2023.

An anime television series adaptation of the spin-off manga Nijiyon: Love Live! Nijigasaki Gakuen School Idol Dōkōkai Yon-Koma, titled Nijiyon Animation, premiered in January 2023.

Plot
 is located in Odaiba, Tokyo. The school is popular due to its free school style and diverse majors. The story centers on the members of the school idol club in Nijigasaki, who work together as solo idols and their attempt to prevent the club from being abolished. As the story progresses, more girls begin to participate in the club's activities.

Characters
Where appropriate, plot descriptions mentioned below refer to the story in Love Live! School Idol Festival All Stars. Other parts of the franchise, such as the manga and animation series, feature some variations in the storyline.

Nijigasaki High School Idol Club

 (anime)
Yu is a second year at Nijigasaki High School who has been friends with Ayumu since childhood and lives next to each other. She belongs to the general course, but decided to transfer to the music course later in the anime series. Both Yu and Ayumu fell in love with school idols after seeing Setsuna Yuki's performance and decided to enter Nijigasaki's school idol club upon discovering that Setsuna is a student at their school. Rather than becoming a school idol herself, she decided to support Ayumu and other school idols. Yu is the anime equivalent of the Love Live! School Idol Festival All Stars protagonist. Her name was decided through fan votes.
In All Stars, the protagonist becomes interested in school idols after seeing a joint live between μ's and Aqours but after looking for a related club in Nijigasaki, they learned that the existing school idol club is on its last legs of survival and decides to rebuild and reform the school idol club. Unlike Yu, All Stars protagonist belongs to the music course from the start and already owns a keyboard in their home. The protagonist acts as the manager and song composer for the rest of the members. The protagonist's gender is left vague in the Japanese version, but is referred as "she" in the English version due to the language limitation in third person pronoun.

Ayumu is a second year who became a school idol after a suggestion by the protagonist, who is her childhood friend. Ayumu belonged to the general course. She is distinguishable by a semi short hairstyle, a hair bun with a tiny braid around it, and hairpins on her right side of her head. Ayumu likes to put effort toward everything, especially as a school idol.

Kasumi is a first year who refers to herself as "Kasumin." Due to her full name, she's often called "Kasukasu" as a joke, which she hates (as it means "dried out" in Japanese). She belongs to the general course. She is the first person that the protagonist encounters at the school idol club, where she was striving to keep the club alive. She is distinguishable by her beige-colored semi-short hair and a star-shaped hairpin. She wanted to become a school idol more than anyone and sometimes tries to be mischievous towards her rivals. She also likes to send hate mails to her rivals, although sometimes it naturally becomes normal fan mail. Kasumi refers to the protagonist as "Senpai."

An honorable first year student and theater club member who was introduced to school idols by her admired senior, she belongs to the international exchange course. Shizuku is one of the five original members of the school idol club, but unintentionally departed as she became devoted to the theater club. She is one of the original N-rarity girls introduced in School Idol Festival; she originally was a Seiran High School student. She is distinguishable by her long brown hair and red ribbon. Shizuku is considered as a yamato nadeshiko, a classical Japanese beauty, and personality-wise she's very level-headed, kind, mature and polite, and can be pretty shy.

Karin is a third year student who aims to become a model and has confidence with her body; she belongs to the life design course. Her personality is passionate and mature, but, while she acts aloof at times and is aware of her good looks, she' genuinely kind, and also has somewhat of a pure side, and can be clumsy and naive. She's good at coordinating clothes.
Karin is regarded as "2018 MVP" for ranking first-place for three consecutive months; taking only 2nd and 3rd in the other monthly polls.

An energetic second year, Ai is an honor student despite her gyaru appearance. She loves to make puns especially using her given name ("Ai" means "love" in Japanese) and refers to herself as "Ai-san." She joined the school idol club because she likes to try new things. She's very kind and friendly, and quick to socialize. While she's intelligent, she's also pretty goofy and has a rather childish sense of humor.

A third year who always looks sleepy and unmotivated, she belongs to the life design course. Kanata refers herself as "Kanata-chan." She often looks sleepy because she studies hard to keep her scholarship. One of the original five school idol club members, she stopped coming to the club because she had to repair her exam scores; she agrees to return as Ayumu promised her that Shizuku and Ai would help her with her studies. She is one of the original N-rarity girls introduced in School Idol Festival; she is originally a Shinonome Institute student. She became a school idol to get motivation from her younger sister Haruka Konoe, another school idol introduced in the game. In the anime, she's a selfless older sister who supports her little sister Haruka and does house chores.

 
A second year who, for some reason, does not wear a school uniform nor had anyone seen her at the school. Setsuna is an otaku who likes to sing anime songs. It is revealed that Setsuna Yuki is actually her stage name, with her real identity being Nana Nakagawa, Nijigasaki Academy's student council president. She belongs to the general course. She is one of the original five school idol club members and had left because she was unable to tolerate its atmosphere due to her strong feelings towards school idols. This caused the club's failing state. Under her student council president disguise, she commands the protagonist to gather 10 members in order to keep the club alive. After 8 members (excluding the protagonist) gathered, she reveals herself to be Setsuna Yuki and rejoined the club.
Setsuna is regarded as "2017 MVP" for ranking first-place three times out of the six monthly popularity polls held; she held second-place in the other polls.

A third year exchange student who came abroad from Switzerland. Growing up there, she loves what nature brings, like mountains and forests. She belongs to the international exchange course. Emma is distinguishable by her twin braids, freckles on her face and her well endowed figure. Her favorite food is bread and she is able to eat a lot of slices, as well as mixing it with other food. Emma is one of the original N-rarity girls introduced in School Idol Festival and she was originally named "Emma." She was a Y.G. International Academy student. She is one of the five original school idol club members; her absence from the club was simply because she went back to her home country for a while — leaving a letter that Kasumi misunderstood as a challenge lettfer from another school's club.

A first year student who claims to have a very cute face, but is too shy to show it; thus, she covers her face with the "Rina-chan board," a small notebook with a drawing on it of a facial expression she made with Ai. During live shows, she wears a cat eared pair of headphones with a small monitor that covers her face. She belongs to the information processing course, explaining her well-informed personality on technologies. In one of Rina's bond episodes of the game and anime series, she eventually decides to reveal her face to the protagonist; in All Stars, after reading this story, the player is also able to remove Rina's mask during live shows.

Shioriko is a first-year student who for some reason, wants to abolish the school idol club. She later become the student council president, taking Nana Nakagawa's position, so she can abolish the clubs she believes hold no merit for the school. Is it revealed that rather than personally hating the school idol club, Shioriko is just critically thinking about the educational aspects of certain clubs and doing what she feels is right. After events that occurred in chapter 17 of the game, Shioriko joins the school idol club. In August 2020, Shioriko joined the All Stars game's playable cast and Nijigasaki High School Idol Club as an official member, receiving a solo song, a 3D model, and cards obtainable within the games scouting boxes.

Mia is Lanzhu's friend, who was raised in New York. She is bilingual; she speaks Japanese and English. Unlike Lanzhu, Mia applies to Nijigasaki only because she was persuaded by Lanzhu. Mia is 14 years old but is a third year student as she skipped grades. She is currently the youngest main character in the franchise history. She gets her solo song and a 3D model a while after her first appearance, but was only added as playable character in early September 2021.

Lanzhu is a second-year student and Shioriko's childhood friend. She was raised in Hong Kong. Her mother is the chairwoman of Nijigasaki High School. She is trilingual; she speaks Japanese, Mandarin, and Cantonese. She applies to Nijigasaki to study together with Shioriko along with Mia. In All Stars, she got her own solo song as well as a 3D model a while after her first appearance, but was only added as playable character in early September 2021.

Others

Haruka is Kanata's younger sister and a first year member of the Shinonome Institute Idol Club. Like her sister, she was originally one of the N-rarity girls introduced in School Idol Festival, but did not place in the top three of the popularity poll that determined which girls would be a part of the "Perfect Dream Project." In All Stars, she appears in her sister's bond episodes.

Ai's "older sister whom she doesn't have blood connection with."

Kaoruko is Shioriko's older sister and a supporting character. She is considered as caring for her sister, but Shioriko tends to feel uncomfortable for unknown reasons. In the anime, Kaoruko is a university student who enters Nijigasaki Academy as the school's student teacher in the music course. She is a Shion Girls Academy graduate and used to be a school idol but did not make it to Love Live's qualifications.

 (Uzuki) & Kana Ichinose (Satsuki)
A pair of twins who serve as the secretary of Nijigasaki High School's student council. In All Stars, both of them are revealed to be fans of the school idol club.

Broadcast and distribution

The anime television series is animated by Sunrise and directed by Tomoyuki Kawamura, with Jin Tanaka handling series composition and Takumi Yokota designing the characters. A public vote was held to decide the name of one of the anime's characters, Yu Takasaki, who is voiced by Hinaki Yano and based on the player character in the game. The 13-episode anime aired from October 3 to December 26, 2020 on Tokyo MX, SUN, and KBS, October 4 on BS11, and October 6 on region-exclusive channels. It was also streamed live through the Bandai Channel, Line Live, and YouTube Live. Odex licensed the anime in Southeast Asian territories excluding Thailand, where it is licensed by Dream Express (DEX). Funimation (now Crunchyroll, LLC) licensed the series and streams it on their website in North America, and on AnimeLab in Australia and New Zealand. Nijigasaki High School Idol Club performed both the opening and ending themes, respectively titled  and "Neo Sky, Neo Map!".

During the group's 3rd live concert at the MetLife Dome on May 9, 2021, a second season was announced. The main cast and staff of the first season reprised their roles. It aired from April 2 to June 25, 2022. Nijigasaki High School Idol Club, now along with new members Shioriko, Mia, and Lanzhu, returns to perform both the opening and ending themes, titled "Colorful Dreams! Colorful Smiles!" and  respectively.

During the Love Live! Nijigasaki High School Idol Club 5th Live! Where Rainbows Bloom concert on September 18, 2022, an anime television series adaptation of the spin-off four-panel manga Nijiyon: Love Live! Nijigasaki Gakuen School Idol Dōkōkai Yon-Koma was announced. Titled Nijiyon Animation and directed by Yūya Horiuchi, it premiered on January 6, 2023 on Tokyo MX and BS11. The group, along with Yu Takasaki, will sing the opening song titled .

During the live-streamed special for the Love Live! Nijigasaki High School Idol Club project on November 24, 2022, an original video animation episode for the main anime series was announced. It is set to premiere in theaters on Q3 2023.

Music

While working individually, the girls also released singles as group as well as divided into three mini units. The members of each unit were decided by votes from fans. Instead of three mini units consisting of three members each as previously seen with μ's and Aqours, the Nijigasaki girls were divided into groups of two, three, and four. Voting on the three first mini units along with their names concluded on June 10, 2019. The fourth subunit was announced on July 1, 2021 with their name decided on September 1.

As of September 1, 2021, there are currently four subunits: DiverDiva (Karin and Ai), A・Zu・Na (Ayumu, Shizuku, and Setsuna), Qu4rtz (pronounced "Quartz", Kasumi, Kanata, Emma, and Rina), and R3birth (pronounced "Rebirth", Shioriko, Mia, and Lanzhu).

Notes

References

External links
 
Official worldwide website

2020 anime television series debuts
2023 anime television series debuts
2023 anime OVAs
Animated musical groups
Anime spin-offs
ASCII Media Works manga
Bushiroad
Crunchyroll anime
Dengeki G's Magazine
Japanese idols in anime and manga
Japanese musical groups
Lantis (company)
Love Live!
Muse Communication
Music in anime and manga
School life in anime and manga
Seinen manga
Sunrise (company)
Yonkoma